Alexandra "Sasha" Vyacheslavovna Trusova (born 23 June 2004) is a Russian figure skater. She is the 2022 Olympic silver medalist, the 2021 World bronze medalist, a two-time European bronze medalist (2020 and 2022), the 2019 Grand Prix Final bronze medalist, the 2022 Russian national champion, a two-time Junior World Champion (2018 and 2019), the 2018 Junior Grand Prix Final champion, the 2019 Junior Grand Prix Final silver medalist, a four-time champion on the Junior Grand Prix series, and a two-time Russian Junior national champion.

Trusova is accredited for leading the ladies figure skating technical revolution, becoming the first female skater to land the quad Lutz, quad flip, and quad toe loop jumps; the second to land the quad Salchow (after Miki Ando); and the first to land two and three ratified quads in a free skate, achieved at the 2018 Junior World Championships and the 2019 Nepela Trophy, respectively. She is also the first to land four and five quads in a free skate, achieved at the Beijing Winter Olympics 2022. She currently holds four Guinness World Records. Her technical score of 92.35 points in the free skate at the 2018 Junior Worlds was the highest ever recorded in women's singles skating at the junior and senior level until the GOE (Grade of Execution) system was changed at the end of 2017–18 season.

At the junior level, Trusova won the first of her two World Junior Championship titles (2018 and 2019) and the 2018 Junior Grand Prix Final at the age of 13, the youngest woman to win these events. At the 2018 JGP Lithuania, she became the first female skater to land a quadruple jump in combination after performing a quad toe loop and triple toe loop. At the 2018 JGP Armenia, she became the first female skater to land a quad Lutz jump in international competition. She is also the first female skater to backload a quad in combination, which she accomplished at Skate Canada 2019, landing a quad Toe in combination with a triple Salchow. Trusova currently has the second highest free skating score of any female skater, with 177.13 points, behind only compatriot Kamila Valieva. Trusova is the first and currently only female skater competing with four different quadruple jumps—toe loop, Salchow, flip, and Lutz—and the first to score above 100 points in technical elements, with 100.20 in the free skate at 2019 Skate Canada and an Olympic record 106.16 at the 2022 Olympics.

Personal life 
Trusova was born on 23 June 2004 in Ryazan. She has two younger brothers, Egor and Ivan. Trusova is a dog lover and owns five of them: a chihuahua named Tina, who often accompanies her to competitions; a husky named Jack; a miniature royal poodle named Lana, which she received at Rostelecom Cup for winning the 2019 World Junior Figure Skating Championships and landing her first triple Axel in practice; a basenji named Alita, a second miniature poodle named Cruella (nickname Ella), and most recently, a new puppy named Selm
a. Both Ella and Selma were gifted to her by fans from China.

A short biography of her career through her teenage years has been published in Russian, Alexandra Trusova. The Girl Who Fights Gravity: And Changes the World of Woman's Figure Skating, with an English translation released in March 2021.

As of 2022, Trusova is in a relationship with the 2022 Beijing team event gold medalist Mark Kondratiuk.

Career

Early career 
Trusova began learning to skate in 2008. She trained in Ryazan under Olga Shevtsova before relocating to Moscow in 2015, where she was coached by Alexander Volkov. She joined the Khrustalny (Crystal) rink where Eteri Tutberidze and Sergei Dudakov became her coaches in 2016.

Trusova finished 4th at the 2017 Russian Junior Championships, placing 6th in the short program and 4th in the free skate.

2017–2018 season: Junior international debut 

Trusova debuted internationally in August 2017 at a 2017–18 ISU Junior Grand Prix (JGP) competition in Brisbane, Australia. Ranked first in both the short program and free skate, she won the gold medal ahead of teammate Anastasia Gulyakova. She landed an underrotated quadruple Salchow in her free program. Her total score of 197.69 points was the third highest ever achieved by a women's single skater on the junior level at the time, behind only Alina Zagitova and Marin Honda. She then finished first at JGP Belarus and qualified for the Junior Grand Prix Final.

At the 2017–18 Junior Grand Prix Final, Trusova scored 73.25 points, breaking the junior women's world record for the short program. In the free skate, she scored 132.36 points, approximately half a point less than what her teammate and training partner, Alena Kostornaia, scored. However, Trusova won the overall competition due to her 1.5 point-lead from the short program. In January 2018, Trusova won the gold medal at the 2018 Russian Junior Championships after placing first in the short program and third in the free skate. She again narrowly beat her training partner and silver medalist, Kostornaia, by a margin of 0.6 points.

In March 2018, Trusova competed at the 2018 Junior Worlds, where she won the gold medal after placing first in both the short program and free skate. Her free skate score of 153.49 points set the new world record for the junior free program, and her total score of 225.52 points was also the new world record for the junior combined total score. At the competition, Trusova became the first female skater to land the quad toe loop, the second to land the quad Salchow behind Miki Ando, and the first to land two ratified quads in a free skate. Her quadruple jump was the first ratified in 16 years since Ando's in 2002. Trusova's technical score of 92.35 points in the free skate at the 2018 Junior World was the highest ever recorded in women's figure skating at the time at both the junior and senior levels. Her total score of 225.52 would have placed her first in the senior women's World Championships that year as well, despite significantly lower program component scores and the absence of a choreographic sequence.

2018–2019 season: Second Junior World title 

Trusova began the season by competing in the 2018 Junior Grand Prix (JGP) series. At her first JGP event of the season, she won the gold medal in Kaunas, Lithuania. She ranked first in both the short program and the free skate and won the gold medal by 30 points over silver medalist Kim Ye-lim. As of September 2018, her scores at the competition are the highest achieved in an international junior women's competition. There, Trusova became the first female skater to land a quad in combination—a quad toe loop and triple toe loop that received 16.14 points. She also became the first female skater to attempt a quad Lutz in a competition, which she landed but not ratified due to under rotation.

At her second JGP event of the season, she won another gold medal in Yerevan, Armenia. Again she placed first in both the short program and free skate, winning the gold medal by 33 points over silver medalist and teammate Alena Kanysheva. Trusova surpassed her own free skate world record score and became the first female skater to land a quadruple Lutz in international competition (teammate Anna Shcherbakova landed two quadruple Lutz jumps several days earlier in a domestic competition). With two Junior Grand Prix gold medals, Trusova qualified for the 2018–19 Junior Grand Prix Final.

At the JGP Final, she won the silver medal after placing second in both the short program and free skate. This time, she was outscored by Kostornaia by approximately 2.5 points. In the free skate, Trusova landed a clean quad toe loop but stepped out of her first quad Lutz and fell on a second, underrotated quad Lutz.

At the 2019 Russian Championships, Trusova placed second in the short program and second in the free skate, winning the silver medal overall.  In the free skate, she landed a quad Lutz but fell on an underrotated quad toe loop, finishing behind Shcherbakova by 0.07 points. Trusova stated after the competition that she planned to work more on her quad jumps before the 2019 Junior World Championships.

Trusova successfully defended her Junior World title at the 2019 World Junior Championships, placing second in the short program to Shcherbakova and winning the free skate.

2019–2020 season: Senior international debut 
Trusova made her international senior debut at the 2019 CS Ondrej Nepela Memorial, where she won the gold medal and set several new world records. In the free skate, she became the first woman ever to land three quadruple jumps when she landed a quad Lutz and two quad toe loops, the second of which was in combination. She set a new free skate record of 163.78 points and a new combined total record of 238.69 points. Her technical element score (TES) of 98.34 points in the free skate was also the new world record. She earned 14.72 points for her quadruple Lutz, a new record for the highest valued single jump by a female skater.

On October 5, Trusova skated in the team competition at the Japan Open, where she won the event with four quads—a quad Salchow, quad Lutz, quad toe-triple toe combination, and quad toe-Euler-triple Salchow combination—scoring over 160 points. Since it was not an official ISU competition, her historic number of quads landed was not officially recognized as the first in international competition.

Trusova made her ISU Grand Prix debut at the 2019 Skate Canada International, where she won the gold medal after placing third in the short program and first in the free skate. At the competition, having performed quad toe loop-triple toe loop and quad toe loop-Euler-triple Salchow combinations, she became the first woman to land two quad-triple jump combinations in one program at an ISU-sanctioned international competition. She also became the first woman to land a quad-triple jump combination in the second half of the free skate. At the same competition, she set the new free skating record of 166.62 points and a new combined total record of 241.02 points. Her TES of 100.20 points in the free skate was also the new world record. At her second Grand Prix, the 2019 Rostelecom Cup, Trusova placed second in the short program behind Evgenia Medvedeva. She placed first in the free skate despite falling on her opening quad Salchow attempt and another fall on a triple combination and won her second Grand Prix gold medal.

Trusova's results qualified her for the Grand Prix Final in Torino. Skating in the short program, Trusova opted to attempt the triple Axel in competition for the first time but underrotated it and fell. Consequently, she placed fifth in the segment, fourteen points behind first-place Kostornaia. Trusova said that the decision to introduce the triple Axel had been taken in light of its being landed "more or less consistently" in practices in the preceding week and remarked, "I like to risk, and without risking, I wouldn’t achieve what I have by this moment".  In the free skate, Trusova attempted the quad flip in competition for the first time, landing it cleanly, alongside a quad Lutz and a quad toe loop, but doubled an intended quad Salchow and fell on a second quad toe attempt.  She became the first female skater to attempt five quads in a free skate and the first to attempt four different types of quads. Third in the free, won the bronze medal behind Kostornaia and Shcherbakova.

At the 2020 Russian Championships, Trusova placed third in the short program, opting not to attempt the triple Axel.  The free skate proved a struggle, with two falls on her quad Lutz and quad flip attempts and doubling on her first attempted quad toe loop. She eventually landed her second quad toe attempt, as well as her remaining triple jumps, and remained in third place. She was "not pleased" with the performance and said she hoped to master the quad loop by the end of the season.

Competing at the 2020 European Championships, Trusova doubled and turned out of a planned triple Axel. She scored 74.95 points and placed third in that segment behind Kostornaia and Shcherbakova. In the free skate, she fell on two planned quads but landed her quad toe-triple toe combination successfully. She placed third overall behind her two teammates and won the bronze medal. Trusova was also assigned to compete at the 2020 World Championships in Montreal, which were cancelled as a result of the COVID-19 pandemic.

On May 6, 2020, it was announced by Russian media outlets Nevasport and Sport24 that Trusova had decided to part ways with coach Eteri Tutberidze in favor of joining Evgeni Plushenko's academy. Trusova was joined in the departure by coach Sergei Rozanov, as well as novice training-mates Veronika and Alyona Zhilina. According to Sport24, Trusova chose to leave the Tutberidze group due to lack of attention from Tutberidze herself during the months following the cancellation of the World Championships, as well as her overall dissatisfaction with her position in the training group.

2020–2021 season: World bronze medal 
Trusova performed at the 2020 Russian Test Skates and successfully executed a quad toe in combination. At the second stage of the Russian Cup held in Moscow, Trusova made a mistake on her triple Axel jump in the short program and placed third behind Kamila Valieva and Daria Usacheva. However, in the free skate, Trusova cleanly executed two quadruple toe-loops, one in combination, and won the free skate to win gold. At the fourth stage in Kazan, she stepped out on her opening triple Axel in the short program and placed second behind Kostornaia. In the free skate, Trusova cleanly landed three quads but fell on a fourth, as well as one a triple jump. Despite these mistakes, Trusova scored 171.21 points and won her second straight competition.

In the short program at the 2020 Rostelecom Cup, Trusova fell on a downgraded triple Axel and, as a result, placed third behind Kostornaia and Elizaveta Tuktamysheva with a score of 70.81, which was her lowest international result since September 2017. She encountered similar problems in the free skate, falling four times and receiving negative grades of execution on two other jumping passes. Her final score of 198.93 saw her drop down to fourth place, unprecedented for Trusova in international competition, and her first off-podium finish since the 2017 Russian Junior Championships.

Competing at the 2021 Russian Championships, Trusova placed fourth in the short program behind Shcherbakova, Valieva, and Usacheva. She landed two quad Lutzes in the free skate, placing third in the segment and winning the bronze medal. Speaking afterward about dealing with injury, she said that "two quads in the long program is very little for me, and I'll try to do more, but for today, this was the maximum content that I was able to do".

With the European Championships cancelled, Trusova instead participated in the 2021 Channel One Trophy, a televised team event. Trusova was elected for the Time of Firsts team captained by Evgenia Medvedeva and placed fourth in the short program, the only woman on her team to skate cleanly.  In the free skate, she made errors on both quad Lutz attempts, placing third in the segment, and her team finished in second place overall.

Trusova was selected to compete for the Russian Federation at the 2021 World Championships in March 2021 in Stockholm, where she was considered a favorite to make the podium. In the short program, Trusova placed twelfth after putting a hand down on her triple Lutz due to overrotation, consequently failing to execute the second part of her jump combination. In her free skate, she attempted five quads, falling on two of them; however, due to the high base value of her program, mistakes by other medal contenders, and her successful landing of three of her quads, Trusova was able to finish third overall for the bronze medal, 8.57 points ahead fourth-place skater Karen Chen. On the podium alongside Shcherbakova and Tuktamysheva, this was only the second time that a single country had swept the women's podium at the World Championships, after the United States in 1991. On May 1, it was announced that Trusova was returning to the Sambo-70 training center under previous coach Tutberidze.

2021–2022 season: Olympic silver medal 
Trusova picked music from the American film Cruella for her free program, having watched it three times beforehand and persuading her coaches. She debuted her programs for the Olympic season at the 2021 Russian Test skates in September held in Chelyabinsk, where she cleanly executed a five-quad free program for the first time in a public event. However, she said afterward, "this is not a competition, so I'm not completely satisfied". The following week, Trusova competed at the 2021 U.S. Classic at the Skating Club of Boston, where she made mistakes on four out of five planned quads but narrowly took the gold medal over South Korean skater Park Yeon-jeong. In late October, it was reported that Trusova had suffered a leg injury shortly before the 2021 Skate America, which did not allow her to train at her maximum. Despite the injury, Trusova decided to compete and placed first in the short program with a personal best of 77.69 and won the free skate by opening with a quad Lutz. In early November, Trusova decided to withdraw from her second Grand Prix assignment, the 2021 NHK Trophy.

Returning to competition at the 2022 Russian Championships, Trusova placed fifth in the short program after botching her triple Axel attempt. She rallied in the free skate despite two jump errors, placing second in the segment and winning the silver medal. On 13 January 2023, Valieva was stripped of her gold medal for doping (trimetazidine) and Trusova was elevated to gold. Speaking afterward, she noted "the quad toe did not work" but was "still happy with the result". At the European Championships in Tallinn, Trusova placed third in the short program despite falling on her triple Axel attempt again. She landed two out of her four planned quads in the free skate, winning her second European bronze medal. Despite medaling, she said she was "not happy with the skate" due to the errors. On January 20, Trusova was officially named to the Russian Olympic team. 

Competing in the women's event short program at the 2022 Winter Olympics, Trusova fell on an underrotated triple Axel attempt and received an edge call on her triple flip but still placed fourth in the segment, 5.24 points behind third-place Kaori Sakamoto. In the free program, Trusova landed all five of the quads planned in her program, albeit receiving an edge call on her quad flip and negative grade of execution on her quad toe-loop and final solo quad Lutz. She placed first in the segment, setting Olympic scoring records of 106.16 for the technical component and 177.13 overall. However, she placed second overall behind teammate Shcherbakova, winning a silver medal in the event. Trusova became the first woman to land a quad flip and land a quad Lutz at the Olympics, the first woman to land four and five quads in competition, as well as the first woman to land four and five quads in one program at the Olympics. 

In early March 2022, the ISU banned all figure skaters and officials from Russia and Belarus from attending the World Championships due to the Russian invasion of Ukraine, as a result of which Trusova was not allowed to participate in the competition at the end of March.

2022–2023 season 
Trusova opened her fourth senior season at the September 2022 Russian test skate event held in Moscow. She skated the short program segment, debuting a new program to Annie Lennox's cover of "I Put a Spell on You" by Jay Hawkins, but withdrew from the free skate due to an ongoing back injury. 

On 1 October, it was reported by TASS that Trusova had again decided to part ways with coaches Eteri Tutberidze, Daniil Gleikhengauz, and Sergei Dudakov, this time in favor of joining Svetlana Sokolovskaya's group at CSKA.

Skating technique

Trusova's skating technique is distinguished by her ability to compete with a significant repertoire of quad jumps unrivaled by other female competitors as of 2022. Such ability has made her especially competitive in her free skate performances due to the higher scoring of quad jumps in women's competition. The ISU currently does not allow quads in the women's short program, leading Trusova to rely on the execution of her quads exclusively during her free skate programs. At the 2021 World Championships, she had planned five quad jumps in her free skate, managing to land three of them successfully and moving her from twelfth place after the short program to the bronze medal following her free skate.

At the 2018 JGP Lithuania, Trusova became the first female skater to land a quadruple jump in combination: a quad toe loop with a triple toe loop. A few weeks later, she was the first female skater to land a quadruple Lutz jump in international competition, ratified at the 2018 JGP Armenia. Trusova is the first and currently only female skater competing with four different types of quadruple jumps—toe loop, Salchow, flip, and Lutz.

In May 2022, Trusova spoke in an interview of her desire to train to be the first person to do a quintuple jump in competition. When asked about the training, Trusova stated that in 2021 she did train the quintuple jump using the 'fishing pole' harness apparatus used in Russia. She currently prefers to attempt the jumps without using any harnesses, which she describes as awkward and creating impediments to improving her ability to master the new jump. In the interview, Trusova stated that the quintuple jump might be approached as a priority over her trying the quad Axel (which men have already tried in competition) because she has not yet mastered the triple Axel for use in competition.

Business and industry endorsements
Trusova has represented Adidas as a brand ambassador since 2018. She has appeared in numerous digital advertisements for the brand, including a 30-second advertisement for their "Impossible is Nothing" campaign in April 2021. She became a brand ambassador for the Japanese-produced Ajinomoto product Amino Vital in July 2020. In January 2021, Swiss luxury watch brand Maurice Lacroix announced Trusova as the latest Friend of the Brand to join their ML Crew. Trusova also became a spokesperson for the Russian-Belarusian brand of dairy products Verkhovye. She partnered with Canadian jewelry brand Brilliance & Melrose in October 2021.
Trusova formerly used nude Risport Royal Pro boots, but as of late 2021 uses white Edea Piano boots with the same Jackson Ultima Matrix Supreme blades.

Programs

Records and achievements 

At 13 years old, born on the 23 June, she is the youngest woman to win at the Junior World Championships and Junior Grand Prix Final, a distinction previously held by then 13-year-old Yulia Lipnitskaya, who was born on June 5.
First woman to land a quad Lutz jump in international competition.
First woman to land a quad in combination (the quad toe loop + triple toe loop).
First woman to land a quad toe loop.
First woman to land two quads in the free skate.
First woman to land two different types of quads.
First woman to land three different triple jumping pass combinations in the free skate with the second jump ending in a 3Salchow, 3Loop, and 3Toe.
Second woman to land a clean quad Salchow behind Miki Ando.
She became the first woman to ever land three quads in an ISU sanctioned international competition when she landed 4Lz, 4T+3T and 4T at the 2019 CS Ondrej Nepela Memorial. 
She set the new free skating record of 163.78 points and also the new combined total record of 238.69 points. Her technical element score (TES) of 98.34 points in free skating was also the new world record at the 2019 CS Ondrej Nepela Memorial. 
She earned 14.72 points for her quadruple Lutz, which was the new record for the highest valued single jump at the 2019 CS Ondrej Nepela Memorial.
She became the first woman to land four quads, and also the first woman to land three different quads, when she landed 4S, 4Lz, 4T+3T, and a 4T+1Eu+3S in the free skate at the 2019 Japan Open. 
She also became the first woman to land two quad jumps and a triple jump combination in one program at the 2019 Japan Open.
She became the first woman to land a quad jump and a triple jump combination in the second half of the free skate at the 2019 Japan Open.
She became the first woman ever to land two quad jumps and a triple jump combination in one program in ISU sanctioned international competition when she jumped 4T+3T and 4T+1Eu+3S at the 2019 Skate Canada. 
She became the first woman to land a quad jump and a triple jump combination in the second half of the free skate at the 2019 Skate Canada.
She set the new free skating record of 166.62 points and also the new combined total record of 241.02 points. Her technical element score (TES) of 100.20 points in free skating was also the new world record at the 2019 Skate Canada 
She became the first woman to attempt five quads in her free skate at the 2019–20 Grand Prix of Figure Skating Final.
She became the first woman to land a quad flip in a competition at the 2019–20 Grand Prix of Figure Skating Final
She held a technical score of 92.35 points in the free skate, the highest ever recorded in women's figure skating on both the junior and senior level until the GOE system was changed.
She set a new record for the highest valued single jump when she scored a 15.71 on her quad flip European championships 2022
She became the first woman ever to land 4 and 5 quads in competition when she landed 4F, 4S, 4T, 4Lz+3T, and 4Lz at the Winter Olympics 2022. She is also currently the only woman to even attempt 4 and 5 quads due to her ability to land a variety of them.
First and currently, the only woman to land 3 and 4 different types of quads, which she accomplished at the Winter Olympics 2022.
First skater (among both men and women) to land a 4Lz+3T combination in the second half of free skating, which she accomplished at the Winter Olympics 2022. Scoring 19.90 (BV 17.27 + GOE 2.63), she also set the new record of highest valued combination jump by a woman.

Senior world record scores 
Trusova has set four world record scores.

Junior world record scores 

Trusova has set six junior world record scores under the new +5/-5 GOE (Grade of Execution) system.

Historical junior world record scores 

Trusova had set three junior world record scores before season 2018–19. However, because of the introduction of the new +5/-5 GOE (Grade of Execution) system to replace the previous +3/-3 GOE system, the ISU decided that all statistics would start from zero from the 2018–19 onwards and that all previous statistics would be historical.

Competitive highlights 

GP: Grand Prix; CS: Challenger Series; JGP: Junior Grand Prix

Detailed results

Senior level 

Small medals for short and free programs awarded only at ISU Championships. Personal bests highlighted in bold. Previous ISU world best are italicized.

Junior level 

Small medals for short and free programs awarded only at ISU Championships. Previous ISU world best highlighted in bold. Historical ISU world best highlighted in bold with a * mark.

References

External links 

 
 
 
 Official VK group

 Александра Трусова: видео и результаты (Alexandra Trusova: video, results) / MoreDez.ru

! colspan="3" style="border-top: 5px solid #78FF78;" |World Record Holders

! colspan="3" style="border-top: 5px solid #78FF78;" |World Junior Record Holders

! colspan="3" style="border-top: 5px solid #78FF78;" |Historical World Junior Record Holders (before season 2018–19)

2004 births
Russian female single skaters
World Figure Skating Championships medalists
European Figure Skating Championships medalists
World Junior Figure Skating Championships medalists
Living people
Sportspeople from Ryazan
Figure skaters at the 2022 Winter Olympics
Olympic figure skaters of Russia
Medalists at the 2022 Winter Olympics
Olympic medalists in figure skating
Olympic silver medalists for the Russian Olympic Committee athletes
21st-century Russian women